"My Only Wish (This Year)" is a teen pop Christmas song by American singer Britney Spears. It was written and produced by Brian Kierulf and Josh Schwartz. It was released originally in the Christmas compilation album Platinum Christmas. In the song, Spears asks Santa Claus to find her a lover during the holidays.

"My Only Wish (This Year)" received positive to mixed reviews from music critics. However, close to a decade after its release, reviewers felt the song was considered a modern holiday classic. "My Only Wish (This Year)" has charted in various countries, mainly in Germany and on Billboards Holiday Songs. On October 22, 2013, an audio-only video of the song was uploaded on Spears' Vevo account.

Background and composition

On October 13, 2000, American publishing and media company Forbes reported that Spears had plans to record a song called "My Only Wish (This Year)" for a Christmas album titled Platinum Christmas. The song was included in the album, which was released on November 14, 2000.
"My Only Wish (This Year)" was written and produced by Brian Kierulf and Josh Schwartz. It is a teen pop song in the key of C major over a vocal range spanning from G3 to A5. It runs in a fast shuffle rhythm, a rhythm pattern used mainly in jazz-influenced music. In the song, Spears laments her loneliness during the holidays and asks Santa Claus to bring her a lover, in lines such as "He's all I want, just for me/Underneath my Christmas tree". Since its release, the song has been included in more than eight Christmas music compilations, including Now That's What I Call Christmas! (2001), Super Christmas Hits (2006) and Christmas Top 100 (2009).

Critical reception

Michael Roberts of the Dallas Observer described the song as "an unobjectionable but generic retro bounce-fest". Lori Reese of Entertainment Weekly called it "festive". In her review of Now That's What I Call Christmas!, Melissa Ruggieri of the Richmond Times-Dispatch commented, "Thankfully, only a small portion of disc two is devoted to tween magnets including Britney Spears ('My Only Wish [This Year]') and 'N Sync ('You Don't Have to Be Alone [On Christmas]')". Gabrielle Rice of Yahoo! called it one of Spears's best and most remembered songs, saying, however, that it only "made the Top 10 list because the lyrics [and] fast shuffle rhythm ... are just plain cute". In his review of classic Christmas songs, The Sydney Morning Herald Richard Jinman said that this track and Mariah Carey's 1994 single "All I Want for Christmas Is You" were "ho-ho-horrible singles", and Adam Graham of The Detroit News also commented that the "sleigh bells and holiday cheer abound on this bouncy teen-pop ditty ... follows in the tradition" of Carey's single.

Sam Lansky of PopCrush included the song on his list of Top 10 Original Christmas Pop Songs, writing, "another millennial teen pop jam, Britney Spears' 'My Only Wish (This Year)' follows the time-honored tradition of asking Santa Claus for love", and finding it "a sweet throwback to the simpler days of [Britney]". AllMusic editor Stephen Thomas Erlewine considered the song a "pop holiday classic." Steve Leggett noted the song was "a nice and bright backdrop for that Christmas party or dinner". MTV blogger Tamar Anitai praised it as "the absolute holy grail of 1990s pop Christmas songs".

In 2021, the song was ranked as one of the 100 Best Christmas Songs of All Time, by Billboard.

Chart performance
In the United States, the song made its first appearance on Billboard Holiday Airplay on December 8, 2001, debuting and peaking at number 7. Later in 2010, it debuted on the Billboard Holiday Digital Songs Sales component chart at number 49, as a result of digital downloads, and up until 2020 peaked at number 12. In 2015, the song reached number 81 on the Billboard Holiday 100. On the Billboard Global 200 chart, the song peaked at number 112.

"My Only Wish (This Year)" appeared for the first time in the Danish Singles Chart on December 26, 2008, as a result of digital downloads, debuting at number 34 before dropping off the chart in the following week. In the following year, it came back at number 37. A few years later, in 2014, it returned with a new peak at number 29, and spend two additional weeks on the charts in 2016. Since 2017, it charted yearly for multiple weeks per year, where it also reached its current peak at number 14. It is Spears' longest running single in the country with 39 weeks on the charts and has since been certified x2 Platinum by IFPI Danmark.

It charted in Slovakia, on December 28, 2009, at number 54. On December 8, 2011, "My Only Wish (This Year)" debuted at number 170 on South Korea's International Download Circle Chart, following digital sales of 3,671 copies. On December 17, 2011, it sold 13,670 copies. On the International Comprehensive Tracks component chart, it peaked at number 34. 

In 2015, the song had its first appearance on the German Singles Chart, debuting at number 90. Up until 2022, it charted yearly and reached its peak at number 29 in 2021. In 2022, it was certified gold by the BVMI for selling 250,000 units. In the United Kingdom, the single entered the UK Singles Chart on December 24, 2021 for the first time at number 97. A week later, it peaked at number 82, boosted by popularity during the 2021 holiday season. This marked Spears' first entry on the chart since "Make Me" in July 2016 which peaked at 42. Also in 2021, it was certified silver by the BPI for selling 200,000 units.

Cover versions and usage in media
In 2009, Brazilian singer and TV host Xuxa released a Portuguese version of "My Only Wish (This Year)", titled as "Papai Noel Existe", on her Christmas album Natal Mágico. In 2019, NCT's Jaehyun and April's Lee Na-eun covered the song on an Inkigayo special. In 2020, Meghan Trainor covered the song for her Christmas album A Very Trainor Christmas. RuPaul's Drag Race finalists Tia Kofi and Priyanka released a duet version of the song in 2022.

The song is featured in the 2021 Christmas Netflix film, Single All the Way.

Credits and personnel
 Britney Spears – lead vocals, background vocals
 Brian Kierulf – songwriting, production
 Josh Schwartz – songwriting
 Jennifer Karr – background vocals

Charts

Certifications

References

2000 songs
Britney Spears songs
American Christmas songs
Songs about Santa Claus
Song recordings produced by Brian Kierulf
Songs written by Brian Kierulf
Songs written by Josh Schwartz
Songs about loneliness